The Emerald ferry class is a class of ferry operated by Sydney Ferries on Sydney Harbour.

History

Generation 1 (Inner Harbour) 
In November 2014, the Government of New South Wales announced six new ferries would be ordered for use on Sydney Ferries services. In September 2015, the contract to build the ferries was awarded to Incat. The first ferry was expected to enter service in late 2016.

However, the entry into service was delayed due to problems uncovered during testing that required modifications to the vessel. Fred Hollows was the first ferry to enter service, commencing operations on 26 June 2017. The introduction of the Emerald class ferries allowed the final two Lady class ferries to be withdrawn in October 2017.

The sixth was delivered carrying the name Emerald 6. Transport for NSW subsequently announced it would be renamed Ferry McFerryface along the same lines as Boaty McBoatface. However the Maritime Union of Australia refused to crew the vessel in protest at the name. It entered service in December 2017 named Emerald 6 with a Ferry McFerryface sticker below the bridge. In January 2018, following revelations that the name wasn't a public vote winner but selected by Transport Minister Andrew Constance, it was renamed May Gibbs.

Generation 2 (Manly) 
In 2021 second series of Emerald class ferries (Generation 2), fitted with wave-piercing hulls, were built to replace the Freshwater-class ferries on the Manly ferry services. The new vessels were named after Sydney Harbour beaches Fairlight, Clontarf and Balmoral. In October 2021 the first of the new ferries Fairlight was put into service a few days after the Freshwater-class ferry MV Queenscliff was retired. The rest of the vessels entered service throughout the next month. The new Emerald-class vessels were heavily criticized due to numerous problems and incidents that affected the vessels performance. In November 2021 the ferry Balmoral was undertaking trials in high seas when a window smashed and the rudder was damaged. This caused many to doubt the vessels ability to cross Sydney heads on days with big swells. Another problem identified with the vessels was that the vessels were unable to load and unload passengers on the west side of Manly Wharf in low tide. This meant that the vessels were required to use the east side of the wharf, which is typically used by the Manly Fast Ferry, during low tide causing delays for both services. In December 2021 Transport minister Rob Stokes announced that the Freshwater-class ferry MV Narrabeen would have its engine rebuilt and would be returned to service due to the on going problems with the new Emerald-class vessels. The new Emerald-class ferries currently operate all week round along with MV Freshwater and MV Collaroy on weekends and public holidays. On 12 March 2022 it was announced that the vessels had been cleared to operate in swells of up to 4.5 metres.

On 26 September 2022, all Generation 2 Emerald class ferries were removed from service after a near miss with the cruise ship Coral Princess, due to a steering fault.

Design

The Emerald class operate on Cross Harbour ferry services and are designed to look similar to the First Fleet class vessels. The ferries seat 375 passengers. The Generation 2 Emerald class were designed with wave piercing hulls to allow them to cross the Sydney Heads on days with high swells. The most noticeable difference between the Generation 1 and Generation 2 Emerald class ferries is 2 large handle like structures on the bows of the Generation 2 ferries.

Vessels

References

External links

Catamarans
Ferry transport in Sydney
Incat high-speed craft
Ships built in Tasmania
Ferry classes